Guido Andreozzi and Andrés Molteni were the defending champions but only Molteni chose to defend his title, partnering Santiago González. Molteni successfully defended his title.

González and Molteni won the title after defeating André Göransson and Nathaniel Lammons 2–6, 6–2, [15–13] in the final.

Seeds

Draw

References

External links
 Main draw

Pekao Szczecin Open - Doubles
2021 Doubles